The Battle Mountains or Battle Mountain Range is a mountain range in western Lander and southeastern Humboldt counties of Nevada. The communities of Battle Mountain and Valmy lie just to the east and north respectively along Interstate 80 in the Humboldt River valley. Nevada State Route 305 runs along the southeast side of the range from Battle Mountain toward Austin to the south.

The range is roughly circular in shape and exhibits radial drainage. The Humboldt River Valley lies to the northeast with the Sheep Creek Range beyond. To the northwest and west is Buffalo Valley with Buffalo Mountain and the Tobin Range beyond. The Fish Creek Range lies to the southwest and the Reese River Valley and Shoshone Range to the southeast.

Peaks
Named peaks include:

Mining in the Battle Mountains

The range has a long history of mining following the original discovery in 1866. The Copper Basin area was the original location of the Battle Mountain mining camp which later moved to the current location on the Humboldt as a mining support town.
The area produced copper, gold, silver, antimony, lead, zinc, tungsten, molybdenum, arsenic, turquoise, and nickel. The Marigold Gold mine is located in the north end of the range.

References

Mountain ranges of Nevada
Mountain ranges of Humboldt County, Nevada
Mountain ranges of Lander County, Nevada